USS Penobscot (SP-982/YT-42/YTB-42) was a commercial harbor tugboat purchased by the U.S. Navy at the start of World War I. Penobscot performed her towing services for the 5th Naval District on the U.S. East Coast, and continued to do so for the 3rd Naval District through the end of World War II. She was finally retired from Navy service in 1947.

Commercial activity 

The second ship to be so named by the U.S. Navy, Penobscot (SP–982), a 121-foot-long harbor tug, was built as Luckenbach No. 5 by Risdon Iron Works, San Francisco, California, in 1904. Under the name Dauntless she operated on the Pacific Ocean Coast until 1916, then moved to the Atlantic Ocean seaboard.

World War I service 

She was acquired by the U.S. Navy from Luckenbach Steamship Company and placed in service 29 August 1917 as SP–982. Through World War I she served as a section patrol craft in the 5th Naval District, operating in Hampton Roads, Virginia, and the Elizabeth River. and in Italian waters during the remainder of World War I.

She also served in Europe, and suffered a fire off Villa Franca, Italy, on 5 October 1918 that took the life of one person.

World War II service 

Shortly after World War I she was redesignated YT–42 and assigned harbor duties in the 3rd Naval District. She was slated for replacement in 1939, but war extended her period of use to the Navy. Through World War II she continued to serve the Fleet as a tug in New York Harbor.

Final decommissioning 
 
Redesignated YTB 42 in May 1944, Penobscot remained active until 29 October 1945, when she was placed out of service at New York City. Struck from the Navy List 17 April 1946, she was turned over to the U.S. Maritime Commission 31 January 1947 for disposal.

References 
 
 USS Penobscot (SP-982, later YT-42 and YTB-42), 1917-1947. Previously the civilian harbor tug Dauntless (1903) and Luckenbach No. 5.

World War I auxiliary ships of the United States
World War II auxiliary ships of the United States
Tugs of the United States Navy
Ships built in San Francisco
1903 ships